Yemen competed at the 2019 World Athletics Championships in Doha, Qatar, from 27 September–6 October 2019. Yemen had entered 1 athlete.

Result

Men
Track and road events

References

External links
Doha｜WCH 19｜World Athletics

2019
Yemen
World Athletics Championships